Tapping Reeve (October 1, 1744 – December 13, 1823) was an American lawyer, judge, and law educator. In 1784 he opened the Litchfield Law School, the first law school in the United States, in Litchfield, Connecticut.

Early life 
Tapping Reeve was born in Brookhaven, New York, on Long Island, to Reverend Abner Reeve. He graduated from the College of New Jersey (now Princeton University) with a bachelor's degree in 1763, and continued on to earn a master's degree in 1766.

During his graduate studies at Princeton, Reeve also served as a headmaster of a grammar school in nearby Elizabeth, New Jersey, associated with the college. There, he tutored the two children of the college president, Rev. Aaron Burr Sr.: his son Aaron Burr Jr., a future Vice President of the United States, and his daughter Sarah Burr (known as Sally). Reeve married Sarah Burr on June 4, 1771, when she was 17 years old.

Career 
Reeve tutored at Princeton from 1767 to 1770. In 1771 he began to study law with Judge Jesse Root of Hartford, Connecticut.  In 1772 he moved to Litchfield, situated on the crossroads of important inland trade routes, to open a new law practice.  In 1773, he built a six-room, two-story house.

Reeve, while a fervent supporter of the patriot cause, did not enter active service early in the Revolutionary War.  His wife's poor health held him at home. However, in December 1776, the Connecticut Assembly called upon him to travel the state to drum up volunteers for the Continental Army. He then accepted a commission as an officer and accompanied his recruits as far as New York before returning to his ailing wife.

Reeve took his brother-in-law, Aaron Burr, Jr. as a law student. In the beginning, Aaron Burr lived upstairs and took instruction in the downstairs parlor, adjacent to the gathering room where Reeve held mock court. Also on the first floor was Reeve's private law office.

In 1781 Reeve worked with Theodore Sedgwick to represent Elizabeth Freeman (known as Bett), a slave in Sheffield, Massachusetts, in a legal bid for her freedom. Bett had listened to discussions related to the Sheffield Declaration, and to a reading of the 1780 Massachusetts Constitution, the latter containing the phrase "all men are born free and equal". She then asked Sedgwick to take her case to a local court. Reeve and Sedgwick successfully secured her freedom on constitutional grounds. The case, Brom & Bett v. Ashley, set a precedent that led to the abolition of slavery in Massachusetts.

Due in part to notoriety gained from the Elizabeth Freeman case, Reeve's student enrollment began to grow. In 1784, he added a second building (known as the Samuel Seymour House) to house and instruct his law students. Among the students was John C. Calhoun who, like Aaron Burr, became Vice President of the United States.

In 1798, Reeve became a judge of Connecticut's Superior Court. He then hired James Gould, a former student, to assist in running the school.  Together, they built up the most prominent law school of its time.

Reeve is also noted for bringing Reverend Lyman Beecher (father of Harriet Beecher Stowe) to Litchfield in 1810 to serve as a Presbyterian minister for over 25 years, during which time he became notable for his preaching against alcohol and Unitarianism.

In 1814, Reeve was appointed Chief Justice of the Supreme Court of Connecticut.  At this time, Gould took over the law school.  Reeve maintained contact with the school until 1820, three years before his death.  The school continued to operate until 1833.  
 
Reeve's Law of Baron and Femme, first published in 1816, was the preeminent American treatise on family law for much of the 19th century. It underwent revisions and re-publication in 1846, 1867, and 1888.

Personal life and family 
Reeve's only child, Aaron Burr Reeve, was born on October 3, 1780.  Aaron Burr Reeve went on to graduate from Yale, and became a lawyer in Troy, New York.

Sarah Reeve was often in ill health, and died on March 30, 1797.  In 1799, Reeve married Elizabeth "Betsy" Thompson, with whom he had no children.

Reeve died on December 13, 1823 in Litchfield, Connecticut, at the age of 79. His home, now known as Tapping Reeve House and Law School, was designated a National Historic Landmark in 1965.

Works
 The Law of Baron and Femme; of Parent and Child; of Guardian and Ward; of Master and Servant, etc. (New Haven, 1816; 2d ed., by Lucius E. Chittenden, Burlington, Vt., 1846; with appendix by J. W. Allen, 1857; 3d ed., by Amasa J. Parker and C. E. Baldwin, Albany, 1862)
 Treatise on the Law of Descents in the Several United States of America (New York, 1825)

Notes

References
 
 Baker, Mark. Connecticut Families of the Revolution, American Forebears from Burr to Wolcott. Charleston, SC: The History Press, 2014.
 Beecher, Lyman.  A Sermon Preached at the Funeral of the Hon. Tapping Reeve: Late Chief Justice of the State of Connecticut, who Died December Thirteen, Eighteen Hundred and Twenty-Three, in the Eightieth Year of His Age, with Explanatory Notes. Litchfield, CT:  S.S. Smith, 1827.
 Blondel-Libardi, Catherine, "Rediscovering the Litchfield Law School Notebooks," Connecticut History 46 (Spring 2007): 70–82.
 Calder, Jacqueline. 1978.  Life and Times of Tapping Reeve and his Law School. Typescript.
 Collier, Christopher. "Tapping Reeve, The Connecticut Common Law, and America's First Law School." Connecticut Supreme Court History 1 (2006): 13–25.
 Farnham, Thomas J. "Tapping Reeve and America's First Law School."  New England Galaxy 17 (1975): 3–13.
 Fisher, Samuel H. The Litchfield Law School: Address by Samuel Fisher. Litchfield, CT: Litchfield Enquirer Press, 1930.
 Fisher, Samuel H. Litchfield Law School, 1774–1833: A Biographical Catalogue of Students. New Haven, CT: Yale University Press, 1946.
 Halow, D. Brooke. Litchfield's Legacy in Law: A Study of the Litchfield Law School's Influence on Legal Training in America, 1784–1833.  American Studies 493, Yale University Law School, 1996.
 Kilbourn, Dwight C. The Bench and Bar of Litchfield County, Connecticut, 1709–1909: Biographical Sketches of Members, History and Catalogue of the Litchfield Law School, Historical Notes. Litchfield, CT: Self published, 1909.
 Kronman, Anthony, ed. History of the Yale Law School.  New Haven, CT: Yale University Press, 2004.
 Litchfield Historical Society.  The Litchfield Law School, Litchfield, Connecticut: A Brief Historical Sketch. Litchfield, CT: Litchfield Historical Society, 1952.
 Litchfield Historical Society.  Presentation of the Reeve Law School building to the Litchfield Historical Society at Litchfield, Conn., August 22d, 1911.  Litchfield, CT: Litchfield Enquirer Press, 1911.
 Litchfield Historical Society.  The Noblest Study: The Legacy of America's First School of Law. Permanent Exhibition, Tapping Reeve House, Litchfield, CT.
 Litchfield Law School. Catalogue: Reprint of 1900. Litchfield, CT: Litchfield Enquirer Press, 1900.
 Litchfield Law School Students. Catalogue of the Litchfield Law School from 1798 to 1827 Inclusive. Litchfield, CT: S.S. Smith, 1828.
 McKenna, Marian C. Tapping Reeve and the Litchfield Law School.  New York: Oceana, 1986.
 Sheppard, Steve, ed. The History of Legal Education in the United States. 2 vols. Pasadena, CA: Salem Press, Inc., 1999.

External links 
 
 
 
 

1744 births
1823 deaths
Connecticut lawyers
Politicians from Litchfield, Connecticut
Princeton University alumni
People from Brookhaven, New York
Litchfield Law School
Chief Justices of the Connecticut Supreme Court
Litchfield Law School faculty
19th-century American lawyers